Austin William Russell Lewis (born 5 December 1932) was an Australian politician.

Born in Melbourne, he was educated at the University of Melbourne before becoming a solicitor, company director and farmer. On 7 December 1976, he was appointed to the Australian Senate as a Liberal Senator for Victoria, filling the casual vacancy caused by the death of Liberal Senator Ivor Greenwood. He held the seat until his retirement in 1993.

References

Liberal Party of Australia members of the Parliament of Australia
Members of the Australian Senate for Victoria
Members of the Australian Senate
1932 births
Living people
Melbourne Law School alumni
20th-century Australian politicians